Pazanan-e Deh Chel (also Romanized as Pāzanān-e Deh Chel; also known as Pāzanān) is a village in Doshman Ziari Rural District, in the Central District of Kohgiluyeh County, Kohgiluyeh and Boyer-Ahmad Province, Iran. At the 2006 census, its population was 133, in 26 families.

References 

Populated places in Kohgiluyeh County